Return of the Beverly Hillbillies is a 1981 American made-for-television comedy film based on the 1962–1971 sitcom The Beverly Hillbillies which reunited original cast members Buddy Ebsen, Donna Douglas and Nancy Kulp reprising their characters of Jed Clampett, Elly May Clampett and Jane Hathaway, along with newcomers Werner Klemperer as C.D. Medford, Ray Young as Jethro Bodine and Imogene Coca as Granny's 100-year-old mother; noticeably absent are cast members Irene Ryan (Granny) and Raymond Bailey (Milburn Drysdale), who had died in 1973 and 1980 respectively, and Max Baer Jr. (the original Jethro) who declined to participate.

The film was produced and written by original series creator Paul Henning and was intended as a pilot for a proposed revival of the series, but this never materialized. Return of the Beverly Hillbillies premiered as The CBS Tuesday Night Movie on October 6, 1981.

Synopsis
Following the death of Granny, Jed Clampett returned to his roots to live in a backwoods cabin in the town of Bug Tussle rather than living alone at his Beverly Hills mansion after having voluntarily divided his massive fortune between daughter Elly May and nephew Jethro Bodine, both of whom have remained on the West Coast (Jethro is now a successful Hollywood producer running his own film studio and Elly May has opened a zoo for her beloved critters). Jane Hathaway, once the personal secretary of banker Mr. Milburn Drysdale of the Commerce Bank of Beverly Hills, is now a Washington bureaucrat working for the Department of Energy.

It is 1981 and the Reagan administration is desperate to solve the energy crisis: they dispatch Jane and her obnoxious and stuffy boss C.D. Medford to search for the secret formula of Granny's powerful home-brewed "white lightning" which they are convinced could be the miracle cure for America's gas crisis. Since Granny died some time ago, Jane and C.D. arrive at Jed's old cabin, hoping to score just a few drops of Granny's medicine. Unfortunately, what little survives is ruined by C.D., and so Jed suggests that they contact either one of the "youngins" in California to see if they have any of Granny's medicine left because someone who sure isn't going to tell them is Granny's 100-year-old "Maw", who now runs an "old ladies" home in Bug Tussle and still holds the moonshine recipe.

Cast
Buddy Ebsen as Jed Clampett
Donna Douglas as Elly May Clampett
Nancy Kulp as Jane Hathaway
Ray Young as Jethro Bodine
Imogene Coca as Granny's Maw
Werner Klemperer as C.D. Medford
Linda Kaye Henning as Linda (Secretary)
King Donovan as Andy Miller (Father)
Lurene Tuttle as Mollie Heller
Charles Lane as Chief
George "Shug" Fisher as Judge Gillum
Howard Culver as Veterinarian
Dana Kimmell as 2nd Old Maid
Fenton Jones as Square Dance Caller
Heather Locklear as Heather

DVD release
On March 12, 2013, Return of the Beverly Hillbillies was released on DVD for the first time by MPI Home Video.

References

External links
 

The Beverly Hillbillies
1981 comedy films
1981 films
1981 television films
American comedy television films
CBS network films
Films based on television series
Films set in 1981
Films shot in Los Angeles
Television films based on television series
Television series by CBS Studios
Television series reunion films
1980s English-language films
1980s American films
Films about hillbillies